The Church of Santa María (Spanish: Iglesia de Santa María) is a church located in Fuenmayor, Spain. It was declared Bien de Interés Cultural in 1981.

References 

Bien de Interés Cultural landmarks in La Rioja (Spain)